The 2001 Colorado State Rams football team represented Colorado State University in the 2001 NCAA Division I-A football season. The team was led by ninth-year head coach Sonny Lubick and played its home games at Hughes Stadium. It finished the regular season with a 6–5 record overall and a 5–2 record in Mountain West Conference games. The team was selected to play in the New Orleans Bowl, in which it defeated North Texas.

Schedule

References

Colorado State
Colorado State Rams football seasons
New Orleans Bowl champion seasons
Colorado State Rams football